Tina (born Martina Csillagová; 11 March 1984) is a Slovak singer. She won the Best Female Singer prize at the Slávik Awards in 2011 and 2012. Tina co-hosted the 2011 edition of Czech/Slovak television series SuperStar alongside Leoš Mareš. She returned to host alongside Mareš in the first two series of The Voice Česko Slovensko.

Personal life
Tina has a son, Leo, with footballer Richard Lásik. She married rapper  in 2014.

Discography

Studio albums
2004: Tina
2006: Chillin
2009: Veci sa menia
2011: S.E.X.Y.

Awards and nominations

References

External links

1984 births
Living people
Musicians from Prešov
21st-century Slovak women singers
Slovak women television presenters